Ciofani is a surname. Notable people with the surname include:

Anne-Cécile Ciofani (born 1993), French rugby player
Daniel Ciofani (born 1985), Italian footballer
Gianni Ciofani (born 1982), Italian scientist
Matteo Ciofani (born 1988), Italian footballer, brother of Daniel
Walter Ciofani (born 1962), French hammer thrower